Club Polideportivo El Ejido 2012 is a Spanish football club based in El Ejido, in the autonomous community of Andalusia. Founded in 1989 under the name of El Ejido Fútbol Sala (was only a futsal club until 2012), it currently plays in Segunda División RFEF – Group 5, the fourth division on Spain.

History
In 2013, the club absorbed CP Berja and name changed to CD El Ejido 2012.

On 25 June 2016, El Ejido were promoted to Segunda División B after overcoming CD Laredo in the last round of the promotion play-offs. The season in the new category was complicated, but the club managed to remain its place in Segunda División B by finishing 14th among 20 teams.

In the 2018–19 season, the club was relegated to Tercera División by finishing 17th in the Segunda División B, Group 4.

Season to season

4 seasons in Segunda División B
1 season in Segunda División RFEF
3 seasons in Tercera División

Current squad

References

External links
Official website 
CD El Ejido at BDFutbol

Association football clubs established in 2012
2012 establishments in Spain
Football clubs in Andalusia